Roberto Reyes Barreiro (Izamal, Yucatan, Mexico, Mexico 1871—Veracruz, Veracruz, Mexico 1928) was an activist, surgeon, and political leader in the Mexican states of Yucatán and Veracruz. Reyes Barreiro was the founder of the local Red Cross chapter in Veracruz, as well as a 33rd Degree Mason. He was a published author and poet, and wrote articles, essays, short stories, and editorials for the Veracruz newspaper, El Dictamen.

Early life
Born into a family of doctors, attorneys, and intellectuals, Roberto Reyes Barreiro was the sixth of 12 children. He graduated with honors from the Universidad Autónoma de Yucatán in Mérida, where he excelled academically as well as in campus politics. It was there that he discovered his oratorical ability and his admiration for Left-leaning politicos, especially Marx and Engels; Reyes Barreiro leaned to the political Left for the entirety of his adult life.

Publications
Farsa política en Yucatán. La lucha entre el gobierno y el pueblo, Campeche, Imprenta 
“El Criterio Público”, 1909, prefacio.
“El pueblo de hoy no es el de hace treinta años: conoce sus obligaciones y sus derechos.” Roberto Reyes Barreiro, 1909.(Political Farce In Yucatán. The Struggle Between The Government and the People, Compeche, Printed in "The Public Criterion", 1909, preface.) ("The citizenry of today is not what it was 30 years ago: it knows its obligations and its rights"—English Translation)

Medicine and activism
He practiced medicine in Yucatán following his graduation for a short period before his socialist views got him into trouble with the government, and he was expelled from the state. Moving first to Mexico City with relatives, then later to the port city of Veracruz, he met and married a young nurse, Edilberta Baquedano, and started a practice to treat the city's poorest residents. True to his heart, Reyes Barreiro preached the gospel of Left politics to his patients and to anyone who would listen. He spent many long hours making his rounds on horseback and, when possible, by carriage, often toting his doctor bag and several books on politics, poetry, science and medicine. During the Mexican Revolution (1910–1920), Reyes Barreiro was often one of the few people allowed on the streets after dark during the curfew, to tend to his patients, revolutionaries, friends and foes alike.

Doctor to an icon
On May 1, 1914, during the invasion of Veracruz by the American Frank Friday Fletcher, Reyes Barreiro was among the surgeons attending to the noted Mexican hero José Azueta. When Fletcher's U.S. Marine forces shot and injured Azueta, it was doctors Reyes Barreiro and Rafael Cuervo Xicoy who tended Azueta's wounds. When Fletcher heard of Azueta's bravery in battle, he sent an envoy to ask for Azueta's permission to call and pay his respects. Azueta, receiving Fletcher's request, relayed his answer through Reyes Barreiro (the surgeon on duty when the envoy called): "I am armed only with my service pistol, but if the American [Fletcher] sets one foot in my house I will take either his life or mine." Fletcher, upon hearing this response from Azueta, then offered to send his personal physician to care for Azueta and his wounds. Azueta's answer was "Please tell the admiral that I am in the best care that medicine has to offer, either in Mexico or the United States." Azueta died on May 10, 1914 from his wounds, a week after his 20th birthday.

Veracruz Red Cross
In 1918, Reyes Barreiro and several other doctors gathered to discuss the founding of a Red Cross chapter in Veracruz. On January 2, 1919, a formal sub-chapter of the Red Cross in Veracruz was granted by the main Red Cross chapter in Orizaba, Mexico. For the first time in the almost 400 years since its founding, the people of Veracruz had a formal place to turn in the time of emergencies, revolution and chaos.

Tenant advocacy
Reyes Barreiro was later noted as the leader of the Movimiento Inquilinario—the "Tenant's Union" of Veracruz. In 1927, the rents in Veracruz were climbing higher and higher, with the majority of an average citizen's wage going toward rent. Tenants grew increasingly agitated by the situation and decided to go on ‘‘strike’’ by ceasing rent payments, electing Reyes Barreiro as their leader. Reyes Barreiro was opposed by another local activist, communist Heron Proal, who would later lead the group of tenants in their struggle against the injustices of the landlords. Reyes Barreiro is noted as the source of the quote "The citizenry of today is not as it was 30 years ago—it knows its rights and responsibilities." The Tenants' Strike in Veracruz served as a model for later strikers in Mexico, the United States and around the world. From that point forward tenants, dockworkers, revolutionaries and even prostitutes used the example set by the Veracruz Renters to model their own strikes against perceived oppressors.

Personal life
Reyes Barreiro was a founding member of one of Veracruz' Freemason temples and, throughout his life in that city, wrote extensively for the newspaper El Dictamen. He favored poetry—most notably love poems—but also distinguished himself as a keen observer of life while making his rounds in revolutionary Veracruz.

Death
Reyes Barreiro died in 1928 at the age of 51 in Veracruz, leaving behind a wife and ten adult children. Police ruled Reyes Barreiro's death a suicide, however he was found with two lethal gunshot wounds to the head from two different angles. Due to the suspicious circumstances of his death, it is speculated that he was assassinated by the (then) federal government in Mexico.

References

Revolution in the Street: Women, Workers, and Urban Protest in Veracruz, 1870-1927 (Latin American Silhouettes)Paperback– January 1, 2003

External links
Movimiento Inquilinario
Azueta Biography in Spanish from the Mexican Government
Jose Azueta - Spanish Wikipedia
Direct Quote - Roberto Reyes Barreiro
"Revolution In The Street - Women, Workers and Urban Protest in Veracruz"
El Dictamen de Veracruz
"Nuestra Historia" - a history of the Red Cross in Veracuz (Spanish)

Revolución en la calle: las mujeres, los trabajadores, y la protesta urbana en Veracruz, 1870-1927 latinoamericano Siluetas) 
por Andrew Grant Wood  (Autor)
 https://books.google.com/books?id=ZXL3rsmEL9YC&pg=PA72&lpg=PA72&dq=roberto+reyes+barreiro&source=bl&ots=Cvb4JNphj0&sig=ENz-yTmdWE4Ezx1W0aGCQpIy6Vk&hl=en&sa=X&ei=aCAgVeTrNIrtsAWO94HoCQ&ved=0CEwQ6AEwCQ#v=onepage&q&f=false

1871 births
1928 deaths
Mexican activists
People from Mérida, Yucatán
Politicians from Yucatán (state)
People from Veracruz (city)
Politicians from Veracruz
Mexican male poets
Mexican male writers